The 1911–12 Yale Bulldogs men's ice hockey season was the 17th season of play for the program.

Season
Yale began the season looking to recover from a poor showing in 1911. After opening with a win over St. Paul's School, Yale headed into their winter break with two 3-game series on the slate. They met Princeton in Cleveland and got their first look at one of the game's rising stars, Hobey Baker. Yale played admirably, winning the last game in overtime, but it was clear that the Bulldog defense had its hand's full with the Tiger rover. The Elis fared better in the series with Cornell, taking the first two games from the defending champions before the Big Red offense awoke for the third match.

The team returned home and had to wait more than a week for the next game. When it came the Elis welcomed MIT for the first game at their new on-campus rink. The facility was a temporary erection near Yale Field and the Bulldogs christened the venue with a 5–3 victory where they demonstrated a great deal of teamwork.

With Harvard having withdrawn from the IHA, Yale's biggest competition for the crown came from Princeton but they were sure to receive a fight from Cornell as well. In the match against the Big Red the two teams fought to a 1–1 tie after regulation. The team captains agreed to play one overtime sessions which would only end once a goal had been scored. The sudden death session continued unabated for 25 minutes and 8 seconds before Archer Harmon scored to give the Elis the win. The game set a record for the longest overtime period played at the St. Nicholas Rink.

After downing Mass Ag 3–0 the Bulldogs faced Princeton in what was expected to be the game to ultimately decide the IHA champion. Neither team was able to score in the first half, with Yale's defense playing particularly well. The Elis opened the scoring with a goal from Cox but afterwards Hobey Baker took over the game. In the final 17 minutes he scored a hat-trick and assisted on a fourth goal to give Princeton a 4–1 victory and all but seal their league championship. Despite the disappointment Yale's season was far from over and they responded with two wins before their third league game.

Columbia entered the game with neither team having much chance for the title but that didn't stop the two teams from producing a very competitive game. The pair battled to a 3–3 tie at the end of the first half but Columbia took over in the second, scoring four times en route to a 7–4 win. The team avoided disaster in the following game by producing a 4-goal second half to overcome a 2-goal lead to down Dartmouth. The game was notable for most of the regular defensive corps being absent, including Carhart who was replaced in net by Thayer.

Yale ended its season with a best of three series against Harvard. Poor ice hampered both teams in the first game but it was the home Crimson who were able to earn the win with their typical oppressive defense. Line juggling and a change of venue allowed Yale to even the series a few days later despite a furious attack by Harvard at the end of the game. In the final  game, however, Harvard opened with the first four goals, all in the first half, and Yale could not come back from such a deficit. The Elis fell to the Crimson 4–2, ending the season with a loss that must have left a sour taste in their mouths despite posting a winning record.

The team did not have a coach, however, Esmond O'Brien served as team manager.

Roster

Standings

Schedule and Results

|-
!colspan=12 style="color:white; background:#00356B" | Regular Season

References

Yale Bulldogs men's ice hockey seasons
Yale
Yale
Yale
Yale